Hirzenbach is a quarter in the district 12 of Zürich, located in the Glatt Valley (German: Glattal).

It was part of Schwamendingen municipality that was amalgamated into Zürich in 1934.

References 

District 12 of Zürich